MUN Society Belgium is an inter-university student club aimed at broadening the mindset of its members as well as developing abilities such as speaking, debating and negotiating through participation in Model United Nations (MUN) conferences around the globe. The organization was founded in 2006 and has won awards and the patronage of the national and regional ministers of Foreign Affairs.

History
After participating in the Catalonia Model of United Nations (C'MUN) in 2006, six students from various universities across Belgium founded MUN Society Belgium in mid-year. The organization experienced a rapid growth in membership as well as in success at MUN conferences all across the world.

, MUN Society Belgium has won the eight last editions of Oxford International MUN and had won the Harvard WorldMUN eight times and was ranked #1 in the MUN World Division.

In March 2014 MUN Society Belgium successfully hosted the annual WorldMUN conference in Brussels.

Harvard WorldMUN
MUN Society Belgium won the best large delegation awards at the following Harvard WorldMUN conferences:
 The Hague 2009
 Taipei 2010
 Singapore 2011
 Melbourne 2013
 Rome 2016
 Montreal 2017
 Virtual 2021
 Virtual 2022

See also
 Olivaint Conference of Belgium
 Prince Albert Fund

References 

Model United Nations
2006 establishments in Belgium
Organizations established in 2006
Student organisations in Belgium